Blood Rain is a 2005 South Korean film. A murder mystery set in 1808, it touches on historical prejudice against Roman Catholicism in the Joseon Kingdom. Although primarily a period thriller, director Kim Dae-seung weaves together an unconventional mix of styles—a puzzle-box mystery plot traditionally associated with detective fiction, class-conscious social commentary, lush cinematography, sets and costume design, and a flair for gore.

Plot 
It is 1808 on Donghwa Island, a small island with a technologically advanced paper mill. The presence of the mill has spawned a bustling village, and given its townspeople a certain degree of wealth. With climate and trees perfectly suited for papermaking—and a location remote enough to ensure both privacy and secrecy—the island has established a profitable business in high quality paper, with trade routes stretching as far away as China.

This isolated and largely autonomous island begins to be plagued by a string of gruesome murders. However, it's not just the mounting death toll that is causing residents to worry, but the sadistic, methodical way in which the victims were killed. With the killer still on the loose, the government sends in special investigator Wonkyu to crack the case. While conducting his dogged investigation, he soon uncovers myriad hidden secrets, tracing the murders back to an incident that occurred some seven years earlier, in which the former owner of the mill was executed for practicing Catholicism. The townspeople, for their part, are convinced that the dead man's ghost has come back for revenge. As the young officer digs deeper into the island's dark past, Wonkyu discovers that there may be something even more frightening than the murders or the murderer—a truth that will make him question the depths of human nature.

Cast 
 Cha Seung-won as Wonkyu  
 Park Yong-woo as In-kwon 
 Ji Sung as Du-ho
 Yoon Se-ah as So-yeon
 Choi Ji-na as Manshin
 Oh Hyun-kyung as Kim Chi-sung
 Choi Jong-won as Royal emissary Choi
 Chun Ho-jin as Commission agent Kang

Awards and nominations
2005 Chunsa Film Art Awards
 Best Film
 Best Director – Kim Dae-seung
 Best Supporting Actor – Park Yong-woo
 Best Cinematography – Choi Young-hwan
 Best Editing – Kim Sang-bum, Kim Jae-bum
 Best Lighting – Kim Sung-kwan 
 Technical Award – Shin Jae-ho

2005 Grand Bell Awards
 Best Art Direction – Min Eon-ok
 Best Costume Design – Jung Kyung-hee
 Nomination – Best Film
 Nomination – Best Director – Kim Dae-seung
 Nomination – Best Supporting Actor – Park Yong-woo
 Nomination – Best Original Screenplay – Lee Won-jae
 Nomination – Best Cinematography – Choi Young-hwan
 Nomination – Best Editing – Kim Sang-bum, Kim Jae-bum
 Nomination – Best Lighting – Kim Sung-kwan
 Nomination – Best Planning – Kim Mi-hee
 Nomination – Best Visual Effects – Han Tae-jeong (Insight Visual), Jeong Do-an (Demolition), Shin Jae-ho (Mage)

2005 Blue Dragon Film Awards
 Technical Award – Shin Jae-ho (Special Make-up Effects)
 Nomination – Best Film
 Nomination – Best Director – Kim Dae-seung
 Nomination – Best Supporting Actor –  Park Yong-woo
 Nomination – Best Cinematography – Choi Young-hwan
 Nomination – Best Lighting – Kim Sung-kwan
 Nomination – Best Art Direction – Min Eon-ok

2005 Korean Film Awards
 Best Supporting Actor – Park Yong-woo
 Best Art Direction – Min Eon-ok
 Best Visual Effects – Shin Jae-ho
 Best Sound – Kim Suk-won, Kim Chang-seop
 Nomination – Best Director – Kim Dae-seung
 Nomination – Best Supporting Actress – Choi Ji-na
 Nomination – Best New Actress – Yoon Se-ah
 Nomination – Best Screenplay – Lee Won-jae
 Nomination – Best Cinematography – Choi Young-hwan
 Nomination – Best Music – Jo Yeong-wook

2006 Yubari International Fantastic Film Festival
 Grand Prize

2006 Baeksang Arts Awards
 Best Film
 Nomination – Best Actor – Cha Seung-won
 Nomination – Best Screenplay – Lee Won-jae

2006 Brisbane International Film Festival
 NETPAC Award

References

External links 
  
 
 
 

2005 films
2000s mystery thriller films
2000s serial killer films
South Korean mystery thriller films
South Korean serial killer films
Police detective films
Films set in 1808
Films set in the Joseon dynasty
Films directed by Kim Dae-seung
Cinema Service films
2000s Korean-language films
South Korean historical thriller films
2000s South Korean films